Margaret Lynch Suckley  (December 20, 1891 – June 29, 1991) was a sixth cousin, intimate friend, and confidante of US President Franklin D. Roosevelt, as well as an archivist for the first American presidential library. She was one of four women at the Little White House with Roosevelt in Warm Springs, Georgia, when he died of a cerebral hemorrhage in 1945.

After Suckley's death at age 99, a suitcase full of confidential letters from FDR was found in her home, along with her diaries, recording details of people she met and events she witnessed at the White House and at the Roosevelt estate in Hyde Park, which are a valuable addition to the historical record of Roosevelt's presidency.

Early life
Suckley was born December 20, 1891, in the Hudson Valley at Wilderstein, the family home of Elizabeth Philips Montgomery and Robert Bowne Suckley, descendant of the prominent Beekman, Livingston (Scottish) and  Schuyler (Dutch) families of New York, as well as John Bowne and Elizabeth Fones Winthrop Feake Hallet. Generally called "Daisy" by those close to her, Suckley was the fourth of seven children, and a sixth cousin of Franklin D. Roosevelt. She grew up at Wilderstein, where she was a neighbor of the future president. Suckley attended Bryn Mawr College from 1912 until 1914, when her mother forbade her from finishing her degree. During World War I she served on Ellis Island as a nurse's aide.  Much of her family's trade and shipping fortune was lost during the Great Depression, but she and Franklin Roosevelt remained close.

Association with Roosevelt

In the early 1930s Suckley and Roosevelt spoke of having a cottage built at a shared favorite spot they called "Our Hill", which eventually became Roosevelt's Top Cottage. Two of the rare photographs of Franklin Delano Roosevelt in a wheelchair were taken by Suckley there.

Suckley raised Scottish terriers and gave one to President Roosevelt, which he renamed Fala. The dog quickly became famous, and Suckley wrote a children's book about him.

During World War II, Suckley often stayed for long visits at the White House, keeping the president company. Although Roosevelt is known to have had an affair with Lucy Mercer during World War I, there is no direct evidence that he had a similar relationship with Suckley, although there was an emotional connection. Roosevelt apparently instructed Suckley to burn at least some of the letters he wrote to her, which has fueled speculation about their content. Surviving letters include affectionate personal remarks, as well as reports and reflections about the progress of the war and meetings with figures such as Winston Churchill and Joseph Stalin at the Yalta Conference.

After Roosevelt died, his daughter Anna Roosevelt Halsted and a friend came upon a cache of Suckley's letters, hidden in the box from his stamp collection that Roosevelt took everywhere with him. There is no indication, however, that his daughter read or understood the significance of the letters, which she returned to Suckley.

After Roosevelt's death

Having served as Roosevelt's personal archivist, Suckley played a key role in setting up the Franklin D. Roosevelt Presidential Library and Museum in Hyde Park, where she worked until 1963.

In 1980 she helped establish Wilderstein Preservation Inc, a group dedicated to preserving the house and 45-acre riverfront property of her family home, now a National Historic Landmark.  She continued to live at Wilderstein until her death.

Suckley died on June 29, 1991, in Rhinebeck, New York.

Cultural references
Numerous newspaper articles published about Suckley have speculated about her relationship with Roosevelt. Suckley's relationship with Roosevelt was the subject of a book, Closest Companion (1995), by historian Geoffrey Ward.

The relationship is also the subject of a play centered on the 1939 visit to Hyde Park by King George VI, by playwright Richard Nelson titled Hyde Park on Hudson. Drawn from Suckley's private journals, Nelson's play fictionalizes Suckley's relationship with FDR as sexual, even though most biographers suggest otherwise. A production of Nelson's play was broadcast on BBC Radio 3 in 2009.  The story was also adapted into the 2012 motion picture Hyde Park on Hudson, with Laura Linney as Suckley, Bill Murray as Roosevelt, and Samuel West as King George VI.

Focusing on how the historical events and people are portrayed, Conrad Black, author of  Franklin Delano Roosevelt: Champion of Freedom, said Nelson's portrayal took "large, …. sometimes scurrilous, liberties with historical facts." In particular, he stated that Nelson erred in his depiction both of Roosevelt's relationship with women and of Eleanor Roosevelt's sexuality. Roosevelt biographer Geoffrey Ward wrote, "It is true that they drove to a hilltop that they loved at some point in 1935, and that something happened on that hilltop.… And it started a long, first flirtatious and then very fond friendship. But what happened in the film did not happen."

Suckley features prominently in Ken Burns' 2014 documentary series, The Roosevelts: An Intimate History. Her words are read by Patricia Clarkson.

See also
Wilderstein
Hyde Park on Hudson

References

External links

1891 births
1991 deaths
American archivists
American people of Dutch descent
American people of English descent
American people of Scottish descent
Bryn Mawr College alumni
Female archivists
Franklin D. Roosevelt
Livingston family
People from Rhinebeck, New York
Schuyler family
Winthrop family